is a major transportation company in Japan. Its headquarters are in Minami-ku, Kyoto. It competes with Yamato Transport, Nippon Express, and other major logistics companies. Its total sales for the year ending March 2005 were ¥728,000,000,000.

The company was founded by Kiyoshi Sagawa. It began operation on March 22, 1957, and was registered as a company on November 24, 1965. On March 21, 2006, it established SG Holdings and transferred its stock to SG, becoming a subsidiary of the holding company.

Sagawa's major customers include Amway, Amazon.co.jp, Softbank BB, Yamada Denki, Culture Convenience Club (Tsutaya), Keyence, Sony Style, Askul, and Digital Media Mart.

Galaxy Airlines of Japan was a member of the group of companies.

1992 scandal 
From 1992 the company was the center of a series of corruption and yakuza-link allegations that helped bring down the ruling LDP, and then the reformist Prime Minister Morihiro Hosokawa.

References

Sources
 This article incorporates material in 佐川急便 (Sagawa Kyūbin) in the Japanese Wikipedia, retrieved on January 3, 2008.

Further reading
 Sagawa Kyūbin Saiken 3650 nichi no Tatakai: Yonmannin no Ishiki Kakumei. .
 Fushichō Sagawa Kyūbin: Fumetsu no Teiōgaku. .
 Sagawa Kyūbin no Daihenshin: SD (Sales Driver) o Kaku to shita "Kōshūeki Keiei" no Himitsu. .

External links

 Sagawa Express, Official website
 SG Holdings, Official website

Companies based in Kyoto
Transport companies of Japan
Logistics companies of Japan
Companies listed on the Tokyo Stock Exchange